Ruakituri is a rural area in the northern Hawke's Bay region of New Zealand's eastern North Island, located north of Wairoa and west of Gisborne. The 2013 New Zealand census recorded 708 people living in the Ruakituri-Morere area.

The community is centred around the Ruakituri River, a major tributary for the Wairoa River.

There are two marae (local Māori meeting grounds) in the area. Erepēti marae is affiliated with the iwi (tribe) of Ngāti Kahungunu and its hapū (sub-tribe) of Ngāti Hingānga / Te Aitanga o Pourangahua, and includes the wharenui (meeting house) of Pourangahua. Te Reinga Marae is a meeting ground for the iwi Ngāti Kahungunu and its hapū Ngāti Hinehika and Ngāti Kōhatu, and includes the wharenui of Tuarenga.

Education

Ruakituri School is a Year 1-8 co-educational state primary school.

References

Wairoa District
Populated places in the Hawke's Bay Region